Kathrin Wessel (née Ullrich; born 14 August 1967) is a retired German long-distance runner who specialized in the 10,000 metres. She was the 1987 World Championship bronze medallist, the 1990 European Championship silver medallist, and won the 1989 World Cup title. She also competed at three Olympic Games (Seoul 1988, Barcelona 1992, and Atlanta 1996).

Biography
Wessel was born in Annaberg-Buchholz, Saxony, East Germany and competed for the club SV Dynamo. She first came to international prominence in 1987, as Kathrin Ullrich, when she won the European Cup 10,000 metres in only her second attempt at the distance. The 1987 season culminated in her winning a bronze medal at the World Championships in Rome, finishing ahead of Olga Bondarenko and Liz McColgan, who placed fourth and fifth respectively.

In the 1988 Olympic final in Seoul, she followed the early break by world record holder Ingrid Kristiansen, only to find herself with a 30 metres lead when Kristiansen dropped out after six laps due to injury. She would eventually finish fourth.

Wessel had one of her biggest career wins in 1989, at the World Cup in Barcelona, when she outkicked Kristiansen in the final 200 metres to win comfortably.

During the early 1990s, Wessel would remain one of the best 10 km runners in the world. At the 1990 European Championships, she won the silver medal behind Yelena Romanova. In 1991, she ran her best ever time of 31:03, which put her fourth on the all-time list behind Kristiansen, McColgan, and Bondarenko. She ended the 1991 season by finishing fourth at the World Championships in Tokyo, won by McColgan.

In 1992, now competing as Kathrin Wessel, she looked set to be a major medal contender at the 1992 Olympics, when she won the German title in June of that year in 31:20, just ahead of Uta Pippig, but in Barcelona she failed to finish her qualifying heat. From this point, she would cease to be a major force on the world stage, although she did manage fourth place at the 1994 European Championships and competed in her third and final Olympics in 1996.

Late in her career, she moved up in distance to the Marathon, achieving her best time of 2:28:31, in 2001 at the Berlin Marathon.

Achievements

Personal bests
3000 metres⁣ – 8:44.81 min (1988)
5000 metres⁣ – 14:58.71 min (1991)
10,000 metres⁣ – 31:03.62 min (1991)
Half marathon⁣ – 1:11:09 hrs (2001)
Marathon⁣ – 2:28:27 hrs (2001)

External links

1967 births
Living people
People from Annaberg-Buchholz
German female long-distance runners
German female marathon runners
East German female long-distance runners
East German female marathon runners
Athletes (track and field) at the 1988 Summer Olympics
Athletes (track and field) at the 1992 Summer Olympics
Olympic athletes of East Germany
Athletes (track and field) at the 1996 Summer Olympics
Olympic athletes of Germany
World Athletics Championships medalists
European Athletics Championships medalists
Sportspeople from Saxony